The 1994–95 League of Ireland First Division season was the 10th season of the League of Ireland First Division. The division was contested by 10 teams and University College Dublin A.F.C. finished as champions. UCD completed a First Division double having already won the League of Ireland First Division Shield.  Drogheda United finished as runners up in both competitions.

Shield
The League of Ireland First Division Shield saw the 10 participating teams divided into two groups of five – a Northern Group and a Southern Group. The teams played a single round of games against the other teams in their group.

Final tables

Northern Group

Southern Group

Final
The two group winners, UCD and Drogheda United, played off in a two legged final.

1st Leg

2nd Leg

UCD won 2-1 on aggregate.

Regular season

Final table

Promotion/relegation play-off
Third placed Finn Harps F.C. played off against Athlone Town who finished in tenth place in the 1994–95 League of Ireland Premier Division. The winner would compete in the 1995–96 League of Ireland Premier Division.

1st Leg

2nd Leg 

Athlone Town won 5–3 on penalties and retain their place in the Premier Division

See also
 1994–95 League of Ireland Premier Division

Notes

References

League of Ireland First Division seasons
2
Ireland